MSA Koraaga (1185) was an auxiliary minesweeper operated by the Royal Australian Navy (RAN). Built by Ante Franov ( Kali Boat Building and Repairs P/L ) Launched in 1973 as Grozdana A.' for Anton Blaslov', the vessel was operated commercially as a tuna-fishing boat until she was acquired under the RAN's Craft of Opportunity Program in 1990 for use as an auxiliary. During military service, she had a crew of nine.Koraaga'' was sold for A$185,000 during a public auction in March 2000, to Klokan Fishing of Nelson Bay, New South Wales She was then renamed Venessa S and re commenced commercial fishing as a Tuna Longliner from 2000 to 2017. She hit rocks and sank at Cabbage Tree Island on the 20/6/2017

References

1973 ships
Minesweepers of the Royal Australian Navy
Fishing ships of Australia